Crystal Sound is a sound in Antarctica between the southern part of the Biscoe Islands and the coast of Graham Land, with northern limit Cape Evensen to Cape Leblond and southern limit Holdfast Point, Roux Island, Liard Island and the Sillard Islands. It was so named by the UK Antarctic Place-Names Committee in 1960 because many features in the sound are named for men who have undertaken research on the structure of ice crystals. 
To the north of Crystal Sound, many geographical features are named after physiologists.

Geographic features in Crystal Sound
Bragg Islands
Shull Rocks
Pauling Islands
Bernal Islands
Levy Island
Wollan Island
Davidson Island
Matsuyama Rocks
Fowler Islands
Dennison Reef
Nakaya Islands
Owston Islands
Kidd Islands
McConnel Islands
Stefan Ice Piedmont

References
 

Sounds of Graham Land
Landforms of the Biscoe Islands
Graham Coast